Plagiostropha opalus is a species of sea snail, a marine gastropod mollusk in the family Drilliidae.

Description
The size of an adult shell varies between 9 mm and 20 mm. The shell has continuous longitudinal distant ribs. The wide interstices are smooth or with revolving striae. The whorls are obtusely angulated in the middle. The shell is white with the interstices of the ribs sometimes more or less stained with brown.

Distribution
This species occurs in the demersal zone of the tropical Indo-Pacific off Fiji, New Caledonia and the Philippines.

References

 M.M. Schepman, Full text of "Siboga expeditie" 
  Tucker, J.K. 2004 Catalog of recent and fossil turrids (Mollusca: Gastropoda). Zootaxa 682:1–1295
 Wells, F.E. (1995) A revision of the drilliid genera Splendrillia and Plagiostropha (Gastropoda: Conoidea) from New Caledonia, with records from other areas. Mémoires du Muséum National d’Histoire Naturelle, Paris, série A, Zoologie, 167, 527–556.

External links
 

opalus
Gastropods described in 1845